12th seeded Serbian Ana Ivanovic was the champion, after edging 3rd seeded Russian Svetlana Kuznetsova in a thrilling last set tie-break in the finals.
Nadia Petrova was the defending champion, but lost in the quarterfinals to Svetlana Kuznetsova.

Seeds
The top eight seeds received a bye into the second round.

Draw

Finals

Top half

Section 1

Section 2

Bottom half

Section 3

Section 4

External links
Main Draw & Qualifying Draw

Women's Singles
German Open